Solo 1: Standards is a solo piano album by Franco D'Andrea. It was recorded in 2001 and released by Philology Records.

Recording and music
Material for this and seven other solo piano CDs was recorded over the period of three mornings and two afternoons in April 2001. The album begins with a medley of a post-bop performance of "Gone with the Wind", together with "Basin Street Blues" and "Way Down Yonder in New Orleans". The next medley, of "I Got Rhythm" and "I Loves You, Porgy", is played in an unusually angular manner.

Release and reception

Solo 1 was released by Philology Records. The AllMusic reviewer concluded: "This brilliant release should be considered essential listening for fans of jazz piano."

Track listing
"Gone with the Wind / Basin Street Blues / Way Down Yonder in New Orleans"
"I Got Rhythm / I Loves You, Porgy"
"Summertime"
"Cherokee"
"Lover Man"

Personnel
Franco D'Andrea – piano

References

Franco D'Andrea albums
Solo piano jazz albums